The Women's heptathlon at the 2010 Commonwealth Games as part of the athletics programme was held at the Jawaharlal Nehru Stadium on Friday 8 and Saturday 9 October 2010.

Records

Results

External links
2010 Commonwealth Games - Athletics

Women's heptathlon
2010
2010 in women's athletics